Garden Island ferry wharf is located on the southern side of Sydney Harbour. It serves the Royal Australian Navy's Heritage Centre, Garden Island.

Wharves & services
Garden Island wharf is served by Sydney Ferries Double Bay services operated by First Fleet and SuperCat class ferries. It is only open between 10:00 and 16:00 coinciding with the opening hours of the Royal Australian Navy's Heritage Centre, Garden Island.

The Captain Cook Cruises Hop On/Hop Off Sydney Harbour ferry service operates via Garden Island wharf.

References

External links

Garden Island Wharf at Transport for New South Wales (Archived 12 June 2019)

Ferry wharves in Sydney
Garden Island (New South Wales)